Mel Lisboa Alves (born 17 January 1982) is a Brazilian actress.

Biography 
Lisboa was born in Porto Alegre, Rio Grande do Sul. She is the daughter of the astrologer Cláudia Lisboa Alves and the musician Bebeto Alves. She studied cinema at the Fluminense Federal University (UFF), in Niterói, but left the course to pursue acting. She has no direct degree of kinship with the gaucho musician Nei Lisboa.

Career 
She debuted as an actress in 2001, starring in the miniseries, Presença de Anita, playing Anita, a mysterious and seductive young woman. Due to the great sexual appeal of this character, she participated in a sensual essay for the Paparazzo site. The mini-series earned an average of 30 IBOPE points and was broadcast in full in 2002 on TV Globo.

In 2002, in the novel Desejos de Mulher, she interpreted Gabriela, a young person from the interior with aspirations of becoming a model. This project was not as successful, due to the fixed image of the previous character and the low ratings of the plot. The actress, at the time, acknowledged that she was dazzled by the success of such a prominent role, but that the experience of interpreting another role with little acceptance allowed her to mature.

In 2003, she made a second sensual essay, this time for Trip magazine. The following year she posed naked for the Brazilian edition of Playboy magazine, in its 29th anniversary edition. In the same year, after a contract signed with SBT which failed to go ahead, she returned to Rede Globo and worked on the soap opera Como uma Onda, playing Lenita Paiva, a spoiled rich girl.

In 2007 she became a television presenter at GNT / Sat TV Globo and released the book Mundo Afora – Diário de Bordo de Mel Lisboa, which included stories and photographs from her program. The same year she joined the cast of the soap opera Sete Pecados ("Seven Sins"), in which she played the role of Carla, a young, humble but extremely ambitious girl with a dubious personality.

In 2011 she signed with Rede Record TV. Her first role was in the series Sansão e Dalila ("Samson and Deliah"), playing the female protagonist.

In October 2012, she was admitted to hospital with an intestinal virus and had to cancel espetáculo.

In 2013, the actress returned to the stage in a theater play, Homem Não Entra, bringing the Western genre to the stage. She also returned to television in a new GNT show, As Canalhas, and a telenovela written by Carlos Lombardi, Pecado Mortal in the Rede Record.

In 2014, Mel Lisboa portrayed the singer Rita Lee in the play Rita Lee Mora ao Lado – O Musical, directed by Márcio Macena and Débora Dubois, based on the book Rita Lee Mora ao Lado – Uma biografia alucinada da rainha do rock, written by Henrique Bartsch.

In 2015 she played Henutmire in Os Dez Mandamentos, her most recent work on Rede Record.

Personal life 
Mel Lisboa was married to Brazilian actor Daniel Alvim from 2004 to 2008, and on November 8 of that same year, married musician Felipe Rosseno. The couple has been together since then and they have two children.

In 2009, she declared herself an atheist in an interview given to Tpm magazine.

Filmography

Television

Film

Internet

Theater

References

External links
 

1982 births
Living people
People from Porto Alegre
Brazilian television actresses
Brazilian stage actresses
Brazilian film actresses
Actresses from Rio Grande do Sul
Brazilian atheists
20th-century Brazilian actresses
21st-century Brazilian actresses